"What Ya Gonna Do Now?" and "Bloody Annoying" are songs by singer-songwriter Graham Coxon. The songs were released as a limited edition double A-sided single on 23 October 2006 in promotion of Coxon's October 2006 UK tour (see 2006 in British music). The tracks were recorded in August 2006 by Coxon and his new band. The single is also Coxon's second double A-side in a row, following "I Can't Look at Your Skin" / "What's He Got?", released in July 2006.

This is also the only studio recording commercially available featuring Coxon's touring band of Toby MacFarlaine, Owen Thomas & Stephen Gilchrist also occasionally known as Burnt to Bitz.

Track listings
Promo CD CDRDJ6721, 7" R6721
"What Ya Gonna Do Now?" – 2:33
"Bloody Annoying" – 3:13

References

External links
Graham Coxon official website

2006 singles
Graham Coxon songs